Filippo Colonna may refer to several Princes of Paliano:

 Filippo I Colonna (1578–1639)
 Filippo II Colonna (1663–1714), great-grandson of Filippo I